Ernest Warden Gordon Mucklow (3 September, 1898 – 23 April, 1953) was an Australian football player. He played for Port Adelaide Football Club in the 1920s and 1930s. He also played for Victorian countryside, Dimboola, during the 1920s. Mucklow also worked as a furnaceman.

Family
Ernest Mucklow was the son of William Joseph Mucklow (1865–1932) and Mary Mucklow (1863–1935), née Drewett. He was born at Charleston, South Australia on 3 September, 1898.

He married Winifred Dorothy Mazey (1900–1979) on 15 August, 1921.

Death
He died (suddenly) of a coronary occlusion at Semaphore Park, South Australia on 23 April, 1953.

See also
 1927 Melbourne Carnival

References

1953 deaths
Port Adelaide Football Club (SANFL) players
Port Adelaide Football Club players (all competitions)
Australian rules footballers from South Australia
Dimboola Football Club players
1898 births